Zarda is a traditional boiled sweet rice dish, native to the Indian subcontinent, made with saffron, milk and sugar, and flavoured with cardamom, raisins, pistachios or almonds. The name 'zarda' comes from Persian word 'zard'  meaning 'yellow', because the food coloring added to the rice gives it a yellow color. Zarda is typically served after a meal.  In the Indian subcontinent, zarda was and still remains a popular dessert on special occasions such as weddings. It is quite similar to sholezard, a traditional Iranian dessert, and zerde, a traditional Turkish dessert.

Often in Pakistan, instead of yellow food coloring, multiple food colorings are added so the rice grains are of multiple colors. Additionally, khoya, candied fruits (murabba) and nuts are an essential part of zarda made at auspicious occasions. There also is a popular use of raisins, and other dried fruits to dish.

Dating back to Mughal India, zarda had a variation with an addition of small fried sweetmeat pieces called 'mutanjan'.  This dish was a favourite of Emperor Shahjahan and was often made on his request.  This rice dish was made for guests at special banquets.

The Assyrian people also prepare this dish (with the same name), typically made while fasting during Lent—thus prepared without dairy products.

See also
 List of rice dishes
 Pakistani rice dishes
 Pudding

References

Indian desserts
Pakistani desserts
Pakistani rice dishes
Rice pudding
Hyderabadi cuisine